War and Peace are two paintings made by Brazilian painter Candido Portinari between 1952 and 1956. They were painted for permanent exhibition in the United Nations General Assembly Building at the United Nations headquarters in New York, as a gift from the Brazilian government.

Display at the United Nations Headquarters

Once the completed set of paintings were received in 1956 by the UN headquarters in New York City, they were placed behind glass frames in order to help prevent damage from the public.

Portinari was banned from entering the US to inaugurate the panels, due to his participation in the Communist Party.

The panels were originally placed in the entrance hall of the United Nations General Assembly and were therefore viewable only by diplomats, heads of state and other delegates addressing the Assembly. Because of security issues, the paintings were not visible even to visitors on guided tours of the UN.

However, the panels were still exposed to sunlight, and during the next 54 years, that exposure took its toll on the masterpieces. In 2010, the UN sent the works to Rio de Janeiro for restoration. After going through a long restoration process, the paintings were displayed to the public in Brazil and France, before being sent back to New York in December 2014. The murals remained covered until the re-inauguration on 8 September 2015.

During the re-inauguration Ban Ki-moon also stated, "War and Peace are more than magnificent works of art. They are Portinari’s call to action. Thanks to him, all leaders who enter the United Nations see the terrible toll of war and the universal dream for peace."

Analysis of the work 
The two panels do not feature any weapons, but instead feature the suffering of victims from war, which illustrates the barbarity of combat. The contrast between the elements of chaos and harmony show the importance of maintaining peace and the attempts to end violent conflicts. Though painted in the 1950s, they were, and still are a representation of the worldwide struggle for peace. The whole set of paintings work together as a representation of the atrocity of war and the importance of peace in the world.

War and Peace were re-inaugurated in the United Nations Headquarters on 8 September 2015. The murals were celebrated by several guests, among whom were several heads of states, iconic artists, and the UN Secretary-General Ban Ki-moon. During this event people shared a moment of silence in order to honour Portinari and his contributions. Overall, the murals were acknowledged as a symbol of obtaining and working towards worldwide peace.

Portinari reportedly sacrificed his own health for the murals, as during the long-term process of creating the artworks Portinari became increasingly sick because of the paint he used. Doctors had warned him about being intoxicated due to inhalation, which would cause a decline in his health. Despite this, Portinari was dedicated to finishing his masterpieces, through which he hoped to send an important message to the world. He was able to complete the timeless murals, though, this cost him his health: he died on 6 February 1962 due to lead intoxication.

Nevertheless, Portinari remains eternal through his numerous paintings, including the murals of War and Peace. As UN Secretary General Ban Ki-moon stated during the re-installation, "Portinari is no longer alive, but his legacy will live forever at the United Nations. Let us realize his vision and move from war to peace."

See also
 United Nations Art Collection

References

External links
 An exhibition of the work
 
 
 
 

Sources: un.org, g1.globo.com, epoca.globo.com

1950s paintings
Brazilian paintings
War paintings
Diplomatic gifts
Headquarters of the United Nations
United Nations art collection
Candido Portinari